The 2012–13 Liga Nacional de Fútbol de Guatemala season was the 14th season in which the Apertura and Clausura season is used. The season began on 15 July 2012 and ended in May 2013. Comunicaciones won both the Apertura and Clausura tournaments.

Format
The format for both championships are identical. Each championship will have two stages: a first stage and a playoff stage. The first stage of each championship is a double round-robin format. The teams that finishes 1 and 2 in the standings will advance to the playoffs semifinals, while the teams that finish 3–6 will enter in the quarterfinals. The winner of each quarterfinals will advance to the semifinals. The winners of the semifinals will advance to the finals, which will determine the tournament champion.

Teams

Penarol La Mesilla changed their names to Halcones FC for this season.

Torneo Apertura
The 2012 Torneo Apertura began on 15 July 2012 and ends in December 2012.

Standings

Results

Playoffs

 Comunicaciones qualified for 2013–14 CONCACAF Champions League.

Torneo Clausura

Standings

Results

Playoffs

Aggregate table

References

Liga Nacional de Fútbol de Guatemala seasons
1
Guatemala